Ultralente insulin was a long-acting form of insulin. It has an onset of 4 to 6 hours, a peak of 14 to 24 hours, and a duration of 28 to 36 hours. Ultralente insulin, along with lente insulin, were discontinued in the US by manufacturers in the mid-2000s. One of the reasons for discontinuation was declining use in favor of NPH insulin and other newer insulin products. The FDA withdrew approval for ultralente insulin products by 2011.

History

Insulin which was extracted from animal sources was used as a medicine as early as 1922. These early insulin preparations required multiple daily injections due to the short duration of action and quick degradation of the insulin protein. For this reason, researchers began studying how to prolong the effects of injected insulin. In 1952, a team at Novo Terapeutisk led by K. Hallas-Møller discovered that crystals of various sizes would form when zinc was added to insulin suspensions. Larger insulin crystals take longer to dissolve into the bloodstream when injected into the body, and as such have a much longer duration of action than amorphous or small insulin crystals. Ultralente insulin was considered to be a "long-acting" insulin that could be used once per day to provide a basal level of insulin, similar to some protamine-containing preparations.

While originally isolated from bovine or porcine sources, the advent of recombinant DNA technology in the 1980s allowed human insulin to be mass produced in yeast or bacteria. By the mid 1990s, ultralente insulin was being prepared from recombinant human insulin, instead of insulin extracted from animals. The advent of insulin analogues and continued use of NPH insulin led to the discontinuation of ultralente insulin products in the mid-2000s, and FDA approval to be marketed in the US was withdrawn by 2011.

Lente insulin was a combination of ultralente insulin and amorphous, or plain, insulin in a fixed percentage combination. Ultralente insulin comprises 65% of the lente insulin preparation Vetsulin®/Caninsulin® which is produced by Merck Animal Health for veterinary use.

Adverse effects

Hypoglycemia 

The primary adverse effect of any insulin product is hypoglycemia, or low blood sugar. Hypoglycemia can manifest as dizziness, disorientation, trouble speaking, and changes in mental status. In severe cases, hypoglycemia can lead to loss of consciousness if not treated. As lente insulin continues to be absorbed in the body for hours after use, these signs and symptoms may be delayed from the time of administration and begin with little or no warning.

Hypersensitivity 
Lente insulin is a combination of porcine and bovine insulin products which are filtered and combined with zinc to form the suspension. Even product that is filtered very well is still of animal origin, and there is a chance the body may recognize the foreign protein as such and form antibodies against it. These reactions are slightly more likely with lente insulin than with insulin derived from a single source as lente insulin contains bovine insulin which is more immunogenic than porcine insulin.

Society and culture
Historical brand names of ultralente insulin, all of which are now discontinued, included Ultratard HM, Humulin U, and Novolin U.

References 

Insulin therapies